Charles Norman Richardson (born July 24, 1978) is an American former professional basketball player and current coach, who serves as an assistant coach for the Charlotte Hornets of the National Basketball Association (NBA). A 6'5" 195 lb shooting guard, he played college basketball at Hofstra University, and had a brief stint in the National Basketball Association (NBA) in 2001-02.

Career
Richardson was signed by the Indiana Pacers as a free agent on September 21, 2001 for whom he played 3 games before being traded, along with Jalen Rose, Travis Best, and a second-round draft pick to the Chicago Bulls in exchange for Ron Mercer, Ron Artest, Brad Miller, and Kevin Ollie at the trade deadline on February 19, 2002. With the Pacers, Richardson wore jersey number 21 and with the Bulls number 31.

Richardson only played 11 games in the NBA, playing very sporadically in the 2nd half of the  season with the Pacers. In his 11 games, Richardson averaged 2.7 points. His final game was on April 17, 2002 in a 106 - 112 loss to the New Orleans Hornets where he played for 6 minutes and the only stat he recorded was 1 rebound.

After the  NBA season, Richardson played with the team Scavolini Pesaro of the Italian Lega Basket Serie A. He wore jersey number 7. The North Charleston Lowgators of the NBA Development League signed Richardson on January 28, 2003 and waived Richardson on February 21, 2003. With the Lowgators, Richardson played eight games and averaged 6.4 points, 1.9 rebounds, and 1.1 assists each game. He wore #31.

In March 2004, Richardson signed with the team Guaiqueríes de Margarita of the Venezuelan LPB. In his first game with, Richardson scored 15 points, but his team lost.

During the  NBA season, Richardson played in the D-League team Fayetteville Patriots with jersey number 20.

In March 2007, Richardson played three games with the Argentine team Boca Juniors before being released due to injury.

Later he played for  Polonia Warsaw (Polen first division) and for TBB Trier (Germany first division) in the 2008/2009 season. With Polonia, Richardson wore jersey #12. With TBB Trier, Richardson wore jersey #31.

Coaching career
On October 20, 2016, Richardson joined the Erie BayHawks as an assistant coach.

On September 27, 2017,  Richardson joined the Fort Wayne Mad Ants as an assistant coach.

References

External links
NBA.com profile

1979 births
Living people
ABA League players
African-American basketball players
American expatriate basketball people in Argentina
American expatriate basketball people in Bulgaria
American expatriate basketball people in Germany
American expatriate basketball people in Italy
American expatriate basketball people in Poland
American expatriate basketball people in Serbia
American expatriate basketball people in Venezuela
American men's basketball players
Basketball coaches from New York (state)
Basketball players from New York City
Boca Juniors basketball players
Charleston Lowgators players
Chicago Bulls players
Cholet Basket players
Eisbären Bremerhaven players
Erie BayHawks (2008–2017) coaches
Fayetteville Patriots players
Fort Wayne Mad Ants coaches
Guaiqueríes de Margarita players
Hofstra Pride men's basketball players
Indiana Pacers players
KK Crvena zvezda players
Paris Racing Basket players
Polonia Warszawa (basketball) players
Shooting guards
Sportspeople from Brooklyn
Undrafted National Basketball Association players
Victoria Libertas Pallacanestro players
21st-century African-American sportspeople
20th-century African-American sportspeople